The Île Tamara Lighthouse is a lighthouse in Guinea. It was constructed on Île Tamara, outermost of the Îles de Los, in 1906, and has been active since that time. It serves as the landfall light for Conakry.

References

External links 
 
 Picture of the Île Tamara Lighthouse

Lighthouses completed in 1906
Lighthouses in Guinea
1906 establishments in the French colonial empire